James Ambrosini (born Brisbane, 5 June 1991) is an Australian-born Italian rugby union player. He plays for Rovigo Delta as a fly-half.

His father was born in Ari, Abruzzo, Italy and his mother is from Australia. Due to his father, Ambrosini is eligible to play for the Italian national rugby union team.

Benetton Treviso
He played for Benetton Treviso from 2012–13 Pro12 to 2015–16 Pro12 season.

San Donà
Ambrosini  signs with Amatori San Donà for the 2017–2018 season.

Rovigo Delta
He Played for Rovigo Delta for 2019–2020 season.

References

External links
James Ambrosini at Benetton Rugby Treviso squad

1991 births
Living people
Australian rugby union players
Italian rugby union players
Rugby union fly-halves
Benetton Rugby players
Rugby union players from Brisbane